Walter Brown (31 July 1868 – 13 August 1954) was an Indian-born English cricketer. He was a right-handed batsman who played for Gloucestershire. He was born in Uttar Pradesh and died in Cheltenham.

Brown made a single first-class appearance for the side, during the 1895 season, against Surrey. He scored 8 runs in the first innings in which he batted, and 11 runs in the second, as Gloucestershire lost the match by an innings margin.

External links
Walter Brown at Cricket Archive 

1868 births
1954 deaths
English cricketers
Gloucestershire cricketers
Sportspeople from Cheltenham